The 1939 NFL season was the 20th regular season of the National Football League. Before the season, NFL president Joseph Carr died, and Carl Storck was named to replace him.

An NFL game was televised for the first time when NBC broadcast the October 22 Philadelphia Eagles at  Brooklyn Dodgers game at Ebbets Field in Brooklyn (the Dodgers won 23-14). The experimental broadcast was broadcast only to viewers in New York and Albany; regular broadcasting of NFL games would not begin until 1951.

The season ended when the Green Bay Packers defeated the New York Giants in the NFL Championship Game.

Draft
The 1939 NFL Draft was held on December 9, 1938 at New York City's New Yorker Hotel. With the first pick, the Chicago Cardinals selected center Ki Aldrich from Texas Christian University.

Major rule changes
The penalty for an ineligible receiver who touches a forward pass is 15 yards and a loss of down.
The penalty for an ineligible receiver who is downfield prior to a forward pass being thrown is 15 yards and a loss of down.
If a kickoff goes out of bounds after only being touched by members of the receiving team, the receiving team takes possession of the ball at that inbounds spot.

Division races
Though both the Giants and the Packers finished a game ahead of their closest division rivals, both clinched their divisions on December 3, the final day of the 11-game regular season.  The New York Giants and Washington Redskins had played to a 0–0 tie earlier in the season, and both had 8–1–1 records when they met at New York's Polo Grounds before a crowd of 62,404.  The Giants did not reach the end zone, but three field goals were enough for a 9–7 win and the division title.

The Western Division race was between the Lions, Bears and Packers.  Detroit was unbeaten after four games, but on October 22, Green Bay beat them 26–7 to give both teams records of 4–1–0.  The same day, the 4–1 Bears lost 16–13 to the Giants to fall to 4–2.  In Week Nine (November 5), the Lions beat the Giants 18–14, while the Bears beat the Packers 30–27, giving Detroit the lead at 6–1–0.  The next week (November 12), the Bears beat the Lions 23–13, and the Packers beat the Eagles 23–16, tying Detroit and Green Bay at 6–2–0, half a game ahead of the 6–3–0 Bears.  On November 19, the Lions lost to the Rams, 14–3, while the Packers and Bears both won.  On November 26, the Bears closed their season at 8–3–0 after a 48–7 win over the Cardinals, while the Packers edged the Rams, 7–6 to reach 8–2–0.  Green Bay was behind 7–3 at halftime in its season ender at Detroit, and a loss would have forced a playoff for the Western Division, but Clarke Hinkle's touchdown in the final quarter gave the Packers a 12–7 win and the division title.

Final standings

NFL Championship Game

Green Bay 27, N.Y. Giants 0, at State Fair Park, West Allis, Wisconsin, December 10, 1939

League leaders

Awards

Coaching changes
Chicago Cardinals: Milan Creighton was replaced by Ernie Nevers.
Cleveland Rams: Dutch Clark became the new Rams head coach. Hugo Bezdek had been released after three games into 1938, and Art Lewis served as interim for the last eight of that previous season.
Detroit Lions: Dutch Clark was replaced by Gus Henderson.
Pittsburgh Pirates: Johnny Blood was released after three games into 1939. Walt Kiesling was hired as his replacement.

Stadium changes
The Cleveland Rams moved from Shaw Stadium to Cleveland Municipal Stadium

References
 NFL Record and Fact Book
 NFL History 1931–1940  (Last accessed December 4, 2005)
 Total Football: The Official Encyclopedia of the National Football League

National Football League seasons